Dronov is a Russian masculine surname, its feminine counterpart is Dronova. It may refer to
Aleksandr Dronov (born 1946), Russian chess player
Aleksei Dronov (born 2001), Russian boxer
Grigori Dronov (born 1998), Russian ice hockey defenceman 
Igor Dronov (born 1963), Russian classical conductor

Russian-language surnames